The FBI's Ten Most Wanted Fugitives during the 2010s is a list, maintained for a seventh decade, of the Ten Most Wanted Fugitives of the United States Federal Bureau of Investigation. At any given time, the FBI is actively searching for 12,000 fugitives. During the 2010s, 29 new fugitives were added to the list. By the close of the decade a total of 523 fugitives had been listed on the Top Ten list, of whom 488 have been captured or located.

FBI 10 Most Wanted Fugitives to begin the 2010s

The FBI in the past has identified individuals by the sequence number in which each individual has appeared on the list. Some individuals have even appeared twice, and often a sequence number was permanently assigned to an individual suspect who was soon caught, captured, or simply removed, before his or her appearance could be published on the publicly released list. In those cases, the public would see only gaps in the number sequence reported by the FBI. For convenient reference, the wanted suspect's sequence number and date of entry on the FBI list appear below, whenever possible.

The following fugitives made up the top Ten list to begin the 2010s:

FBI Most Wanted Fugitives added during the 2010s
It took a year into the new decade before any of the fugitives were captured. The replacements were not named until 2012. The list includes (in FBI list appearance sequence order):

2010–2019

End of the decade
As the decade closed, the following were still at large as the Ten Most Wanted Fugitives:

FBI directors in the 2010s
Robert Mueller (2001–2013)
James Comey (2013–2017)
Andrew McCabe (2017)
Christopher A. Wray (2017–present)

References

External links
Current FBI Top Ten Most Wanted Fugitives

2010s in the United States
 

pt:Anexo:Lista dos dez principais procurados pelo FBI dos anos 2000